The Baptist Evangelical Convention of Paraguay is a Baptist Christian denomination in Paraguay. It is affiliated with the Baptist World Alliance. The headquarters is in Asuncion.

History
The Baptist Evangelical Convention of Paraguay has its origins in a mission of the Evangelical Baptist Convention of Argentina in 1919.  It is officially founded in 1956.  According to a denomination census released in 2020, it claimed 290 churches and 21,500 members.

See also
 Bible
 Born again
 Baptist beliefs
 Worship service (evangelicalism)
 Jesus Christ
 Believers' Church

References

Baptist denominations in South America
Evangelicalism in Paraguay